Christopher Charles Wilkinson (born 1943 in Stockport, Cheshire) is a retired British breaststroke swimmer.

Swimming career
He represented England in 110 yards and 220 yards breaststroke events, at the 1962 British Empire and Commonwealth Games in Perth, Western Australia.

Personal life
His younger sister is Diana Wilkinson.

References

1943 births
Living people
British male swimmers
British male breaststroke swimmers
Swimmers at the 1962 British Empire and Commonwealth Games
Commonwealth Games competitors for England